William Potter House, also known as the Potter House, is a historic home located at Lafayette, Tippecanoe County, Indiana.  It was built in 1855, and is a two-story, Greek Revival style brick dwelling, with a front gable roof.  A rear addition was added about 1880.  The entrance features Doric order columns and opposing pilasters.

It was listed on the National Register of Historic Places in 1983.

References

Houses on the National Register of Historic Places in Indiana
Greek Revival houses in Indiana
Houses completed in 1855
Buildings and structures in Lafayette, Indiana
National Register of Historic Places in Tippecanoe County, Indiana